The major prophets is a grouping of books in the Christian Old Testament that does not occur in the Hebrew Bible. All of these books are traditionally regarded as authored by a prophet such as Jeremiah, Isaiah, Daniel, and Ezekiel. The term "major" has nothing to do with the achievement or importance of the prophets, rather the length of the books. In comparison to the books of the Twelve Minor Prophets, whose books are short and grouped together into one single book in the Hebrew Bible, these books are much longer.

The order of the books

Hebrew Bible
The Tanakh, often called the Hebrew Bible, is separated into three sections: the Torah, the Nevi'im (Prophets), and the Ketuvim (Writings). The Book of Jeremiah, Book of Isaiah, and the Book of Ezekiel are included among the Nevi'im. The Book of Lamentations and the Book of Daniel are included among the Ketuvim. The Hebrew Bible does not include the Book of Baruch.

Catholic Bible
Along with the books in the Hebrew Bible, the Catholic Bible includes the Letter of Jeremiah which is found in Chapter 6 of the Book of Baruch. This was written by Baruch ben Neriah, a scribe of Jeremiah.

Protestant Bible
Most Protestant Bibles include only the Book of Isaiah, the Book of Jeremiah, the Book of Lamentations, the Book of Ezekiel, and the Book of Daniel.

Period of Prophecy
All the books of the major prophets took place during the "Period of Prophecy", which covers the time from the entrance of the Israelites into the Land of Israel until the Babylonian captivity of Judah. It is understood from all versions of the books that during this time, the four major prophets were chosen by God to be spoken to and speak the divine word to the people.

Isaiah 
The Book of Isaiah tells primarily of prophecies of the judgments awaiting nations that are persecuting Judah.

Jeremiah 
The Book of Jeremiah was written as a message to the Jews in exile in Babylon, explaining the disaster of exile as God's response to Israel's pagan worship.

Lamentations 
The Book of Lamentations tells of the mourning the desertion of the city by God, its destruction, and the ultimate return of the divinity.

Ezekiel 
The Book of Ezekiel tells of the judgements on Israel and the nation and also the future blessings of Israel.

Daniel 
The Book of Daniel tell of God's plans to save all Israel in their present oppression, just as he saved Daniel from his enemies.

See also
 Bible prophecy
 List of Biblical prophets

References

 
Christian terminology
Prophets in Christianity
Christian Bible content
Prophetic books